Carlos Zarzar (born 23 February 1955) is a Chilean sports shooter. He competed in the mixed skeet event at the 1984 Summer Olympics.

References

1955 births
Living people
Chilean male sport shooters
Olympic shooters of Chile
Shooters at the 1984 Summer Olympics
Place of birth missing (living people)
Pan American Games medalists in shooting
Pan American Games bronze medalists for Chile
Shooters at the 1983 Pan American Games
Medalists at the 1983 Pan American Games
20th-century Chilean people